Cleptelmis is a genus of riffle beetles in the family Elmidae. There are at least two described species in Cleptelmis.

Species
These two species belong to the genus Cleptelmis:
 Cleptelmis addenda (Fall, 1907)
 Cleptelmis ornata (Schaeffer, 1911)

References

Further reading

 
 
 
 
 

Elmidae
Articles created by Qbugbot